Rönnberg is a Swedish surname that may refer to:

Glenn Rönnberg (born 1961), a Swedish footballer
Hanna Rönnberg (1862–1946), a Finnish artist and writer
Jerker Rönnberg (born 1953), a Swedish professor of psychology
Joonas Rönnberg (born 1983), a Finnish professional ice hockey defenceman
Lennart Rönnberg (born 1938), a Swedish Army major general
Mikael Rönnberg (born 1957), a Swedish footballer
Nico Rönnberg (born 1992), a Finnish handball player 
Roger Rönnberg (born 1971), a Swedish ice hockey coach

Swedish-language surnames